Humanesque is Jack Green's debut album. The track "I Call, No Answer" features Ritchie Blackmore of Deep Purple as a guest artist on lead guitar.

Track listing
All songs by Jack Green and Leslie Adey, except noted

 "Murder"  – 3:21
 "So Much"  – 3:52
 "Valentina"  – 4:22
 "Babe" (Jack Green) – 3:33
 "Can't Stand it"  – 3:35
 "I Call, No Answer" (Jack Green)  – 3:33
 "Life on the Line"  – 4:03
 "'Bout That Girl" (Jack Green) – 3:02
 "Thought it was Easy" (Jack Green, Jackie Green)  – 2:48
 "Factory Girl"  – 2:49
 "This is Japan"  – 3:12

Charts

Personnel 
Jack Green – Bass, Guitar, and Vocals.
Ritchie Blackmore – Lead Guitar on "I Call, No Answer".
Brian Chatton – Keyboards.
Mel Collins – Saxophone.
Pete Tolson – Guitar.
Andy Dalby – Guitar.
Ian Ellis – Bass guitar.
Mac Poole – Drums.
John Warwicker – Design.
Le Breton – Design.
Peter Kuys – Executive producer.

References

1980 debut albums
RCA Records albums